Gaston Grange is a large country manor situated in the hamlet of Holt End in the large parish of Bentworth, Hampshire. The manor lies west of the Bentworth-Medstead road towards Upper Wield, south of Gaston Wood.

History
The manor estate area was formerly part of the Bentworth Hall estate until the 1950s. In the late 19th century, Emma Gordon-Ives owned Bentworth Hall and in 1890 her son Colonel Gordon Maynard Gordon-Ives built Gaston Grange east of the current Bentworth Hall. In 1914, his son Lieutenant Colonel Alexander Gordon lived in Gaston Grange. He served in the First World War and was also a politician dealing with Northern Ireland matters, dying in July 1923.
 
The house once had a grand ballroom which was removed in the 1920s. The white painted house has masonry walls, a timber pitched roof with what is likely Welsh blue grey slate, and a wooden staircase made by the Devon-based firm Dart & Francis. Gaston Grange has been extensively renovated in recent times.

References

Country houses in Hampshire
East Hampshire District
Manor houses in England